The 1960 Individual Long Track European Championship was the fourth edition of the Long Track European Championship. The final was held on 17 July 1960 in Plattling, West Germany.

The  title was won by Josef Hofmeister of West Germany for the second time.

Venues
1st semi-final - Marianske Lazne , May 29, 1960
2nd semi-final - Riihimäki , 5 June 1960
Final - Plattling , July 17, 1960

Final Classification

References 

Motor
Motor
International sports competitions hosted by West Germany